The 2005 season in Swedish football, starting January 2005 and ending December 2005:

Events
26 May 2005: IFK Göteborg loses the historical first final of the Royal League against FC København after 1–1 in full-time and 26 penalties in the shoot-out.
6 June 2005: AFC Ajax signs Malmö FF's Markus Rosenberg, the transfer being concluded when Ajax offered approximately 5.3 million Euros for Rosenberg, who joined the Dutch club July 4.
13 June 2005: Around 30 AIK fans starts a fight on Gamla Ullevi before the start of the game in Superettan against GAIS.
23 August 2005: Malmö FF are beaten twice (0–1, 0–3) by Swiss team FC Thun in the second qualification round to the UEFA Champions League. Discussions about the bad standard of Swedish club football take place.
12 October 2005: The Swedish national team secures a place in the 2006 FIFA World Cup by winning 3-1 against Iceland.
17 October 2005: Djurgårdens IF wins their 11th national championship in the second last round of Allsvenskan by drawing against Örgryte IS while IFK Göteborg lost against Hammarby IF.
24 October 2005: IF Elfsborg announce that as an apology for their "unacceptable" performance they will repay the admission fees and travelling expenses of the approximately 200 fans who travelled to Stockholm and witnessed their 8–1 thrashing by Djurgårdens IF on the last day of the season.
29 October 2005: Djurgårdens IF manages to win "the double" by beating Åtvidabergs FF in the final of Svenska Cupen.
9 December 2005: The final draw for the 2006 FIFA World Cup took place, Sweden being drawn to play Trinidad and Tobago, Paraguay and England.

Honours

Official titles

Competitions

Promotions, relegations and qualifications

Promotions

Relegations

International qualifications

Domestic results

Allsvenskan

2005 Allsvenskan qualification play-off

Superettan

2005 Svenska Cupen
Quarter-finals

Semi-finals

Final

National team results

References
Print

Online

 
Seasons in Swedish football